McPhillips Station Casino (formerly the McPhillips Street Station Casino)  is a casino located in Winnipeg, Manitoba. It is one of two casinos in the city (the other being the Club Regent Casino), both are owned and operated by the Manitoba Lotteries Corporation, and in turn, the Government of Manitoba. 

The casino opened in 1993, after an assessment regarding the distribution of gambling revenue was released.

In December 2015 the casino announced a $45-million renovation plan.

See also
List of casinos in Canada
List of casinos

References

External links
McPhillips Street Casino Station
Manitoba Lotteries Corporation
Manitoba Gaming Control Commission

Casinos in Manitoba
Tourist attractions in Winnipeg
1993 establishments in Manitoba
Casinos completed in 1993